The Northwest Emmy Awards are a division of the National Academy of Television Arts and Sciences. The Seattle, Washington, division was founded in 1963. In addition to granting the Northwest Emmy Awards, this division awards scholarships, honors industry veterans at the Silver Circle Celebration, conducts National Student Television Awards of Excellence, and has a free research and a nationwide job bank. The chapter also participates in judging Emmy entries at the regional and national levels.

Boundaries

The academy is divided into the following boundaries and encompasses the states of Washington, Oregon, Idaho, Alaska and Montana. These boundaries are responsible for the submission of television broadcast materials presented for awards considerations.

Board of governors 

Each year the membership of the National Academy of Television Arts & Sciences Northwest Chapter elects professionals to represent the Northwest community.

The Board of Governors is a working board which works together collaboratively to ensure the best interests of the membership.

References

Regional Emmy Awards
Awards established in 1963
1963 establishments in Washington (state)